The Imagination Foundation is a non-profit organization that focuses on "creativity and entrepreneurship in children".

History
Nirvan Mullick and Harley Cross founded the Imagination Foundation in 2012, inspired by the response to Mullick's short film Caine's Arcade. Imagination Foundation received initial seed funding of $250,000 from the Goldhirsh Foundation.

The foundation's first program was the Global Cardboard Challenge. It initially started as a school pilot program, with over 200 schools in 9 countries taking part during the first 2 months. The program launched world-wide a second short film by Mullick called Caine's Arcade 2: From a Movie to a Movement, which was posted online in September 2012, and ended by advertising Global Cardboard Challenge.

Three weeks after Caine's Arcade 2 was posted online, volunteers organized over 270 Cardboard Challenge events in 40 countries, with over 11,000 kids participating. Following this, the Global Cardboard Challenge became an annual event. Imagination Foundation has also launched Imagination Chapters to provide "creative play" for kids every week, and has also partnered with Disney, Google, AT&T, and Time Warner.

Mullick received the 2012 Big Ideas Fest Innovation in Action Award and the Dan Eldon Creative Activist Award from the Creative Visions Foundation. In 2012, Mullick spoke at Mattress Firm's National "Bed Talks" event, leading to a partnership for the 2013 Global Cardboard Challenge. Mullick and Cross continued to run the organization until bringing on a full-time Executive Director, Mike McGalliard in May 2013. In 2014, the Imagination Foundation was named one of 10 Champions in the Ashoka and Lego Foundation "Re-Imagine Learning Challenge".

Programs
The Global Cardboard Challenge is an annual challenge that invites kids to build things using cardboard and recycled materials. It culminates in a global "Day of Play" where communities display the children's cardboard creations, celebrating the anniversary of the flash mob featured in the Caine's Arcade short film where a community came out to play a boy's cardboard arcade in East Los Angeles. The event takes place in and out of school and is often used as a fundraiser.

In 2014, Imagination Foundation partnered with the National Head Start Association and Lakeshore Learning to launch a national campaign to bring STEM education to pre-school children. The partnership was announced at the Clinton Global Initiative America with a 3-year commitment to engage 30,000 pre-school children in early STEM education.

Imagination Chapters, launched in the fall of 2014, are pop-up groups that meet weekly to engage in 2 hours of "creative play". They launched as a 9-month pilot program in 30 locations in 7 countries, in partnership with Disney, MIT Media Lab, and Indiana University's Creativity Labs.

Partnerships with national business
In 2013, Mattress Firm became the national sponsor for the Global Cardboard Challenge, and collected cardboard and craft supplies at point of sale and then delivered them to American kids participating in the Cardboard Challenge. In 2014, Focus Features and Laika's "The Boxtrolls" joined Mattress Firm as title sponsors for the Global Cardboard Challenge, which included a special Boxtrolls Cardboard Challenge. The US Premiere of the BoxTrolls at Universal City Walk supported the Imagination Foundation.

Disney partnered with Imagination Foundation to launch the Imagination Chapters program in 2014. Also in 2014, Reddit partnered with Imagination Foundation by making the 3rd annual Global Reddit Day of Service on the same day as the 3rd annual Global Cardboard Challenge's Day of Play. Imagination partnered with Time Warner for a special Earth Day Cardboard Challenge in 2014 with over 35,000 participants, partnered with Google on a "Science at Play" initiative, and partnered with AT&T Aspire on an Inventors Challenge in 2016 and 2017.

References

External links
Official Website: www.imagination.org
Global Cardboard Challenge: www.cardboardchallenge.com

Organizations established in 2012
Non-profit organizations based in Los Angeles
2012 establishments in California